Kabelsketal is a municipality in the Saalekreis district, in Saxony-Anhalt, Germany. It is situated east of Halle (Saale). It was formed in 2004 out of the villages of Dieskau, Dölbau, Gröbers und Großkugel.

References

2004 establishments in Germany
Populated places established in 2004
Saalekreis